Chadli Bendjedid  (ALA-LC: ash-Shādhilī bin Jadīd; 14 April 1929 – 6 October 2012) was the third President of Algeria and an Algerian Nationalist. His presidential term of office ran from 9 February 1979 to 11 January 1992.

A combatant during the Algerian War, he was a member of the Revolutionary Council from 1965 to 1976 and was appointed Colonel in 1969.

He was appointed Secretary General of the National Liberation Front (FLN) in January 1979 and was elected president the following month. Bendjedid would win re-elections without competition in 1984 and 1989. He resigned from the presidency in January 1992 following a disputed election and military coup, leading to the Algerian Civil War.

He remained under house arrest until 1999 and died of cancer at the age of 83.

Career

Early life and career

Bendjedid was born in Bouteldja on 14 April 1929. He served in the French Army as a non-commissioned officer and fought in Indochina. He defected to the National Liberation Front (FLN) at the beginning of the Algerian War of Independence in 1954. A protégé of Houari Boumediene, Bendjedid was rewarded with the command of the Constantine Military Region Oran, Algeria in 1964. After independence he rose through the ranks, becoming head of the 2nd Military Region in 1964 and Colonel in 1969. He commanded the 2nd Military Region from 1964 to 1978, and there supervised the evacuation of French military forces stationed at Mers el-Kebir in conformity with the Évian Accords, and the monitoring of the frontier between Algeria and Morocco which was the site of significant tension.

Ascent to presidency

Bendjedid was minister of defense from November 1978 to February 1979 and became president following the death of Boumédiènne. Bendjedid was a compromise candidate who came to power after the party leadership and presidency was contested at the fourth FLN congress held on 27 - 31 January 1979. The most likely to succeed Boumediene were Mohammad Salah Yahiaoui and Abdelaziz Bouteflika. The latter had served as a foreign secretary at the United Nations for sixteen years. He was a prominent member of the Oujda clan and regarded as a pro-Western liberal. Yahiaoui was closely affiliated with the communists, permitting the Parti de l'Avant-Garde Socialiste (PAGS) to acquire jurisdiction over the mass trade union and youth organizations.
 
In office, Bendjedid reduced the state's role in the economy and eased government surveillance of citizens. In the late 1980s, with the economy failing due to rapidly falling oil prices, tension rose between elements of the regime who supported Bendjedid's economic liberalization policies, and those who wanted a return to the statist model. In October 1988, youth marches protesting the regime's austerity policies and shouting slogans against Bendjedid, evolved into massive rioting now known as the 1988 October Riots which spread to Oran, Annaba and other cities; the military's brutal suppression of the rioters left several hundred dead. Perhaps as a political survival strategy, Bendjedid then called for and began to implement a transition towards multi-party democracy. However, in 1991 the military intervened to stop elections from bringing the Islamist Front Islamique du Salut (FIS) to power, forcing Bendjedid out of office and sparking a long and bloody Algerian Civil War.

Post-presidency life
Bendjedid was put under house arrest in Oran but freed in 1999 after the rise to the presidency of Abdelaziz Bouteflika. In a 2002 interview, he revealed his willingness to accept the results of the 1991 poll and work with the FIS while avoiding their takeover of all government institutions. He believed the constitution gave him the power to do so, but he failed to win over the support of the military establishment.

He returned to the public eye in late 2008 when he gave a controversial speech at a conference in Al-Tarif, his hometown. The publication of his memoirs was announced on 1 November 2012, coinciding with the 58th anniversary of the outbreak of the War of National Liberation.

Illness and death
Bendjedid was hospitalized in Paris in January 2012 for cancer treatment and returned to hospital again in May and October 2012. On 3 October 2012, Bendjedid was admitted to the intensive care unit of a military hospital in Ain-Naadja in Algiers. State-run media announced that he died of cancer on 6 October 2012. He was buried at the El Alia Cemetery.

Honours

National honour
  Grand Master of the National Order of Merit

References

External links

Biography from rulers.org

1929 births
2012 deaths
People from Bouteldja
Members of the National Liberation Front (Algeria)
Presidents of Algeria
French military personnel of the First Indochina War
Algerian military personnel
Defense ministers of Algeria
Deaths from cancer in Algeria
Leaders ousted by a coup
21st-century Algerian people